The Floodwood River is a  tributary of the Saint Louis River of Minnesota, United States, joining the Saint Louis at the city of Floodwood.

Floodwood River was so named on account of driftwood frequently forming dams which caused the river to flood.

See also
List of rivers of Minnesota

References

Minnesota Watersheds
USGS Hydrologic Unit Map - State of Minnesota (1974)

Rivers of Minnesota
Rivers of St. Louis County, Minnesota